Below are the rosters for the 1999 FIFA Women's World Cup tournament in the United States. The 16 national teams involved in the tournament were required to register a squad of 20 players, including at least two goalkeepers. Only players in these squads were eligible to take part in the tournament.

Group A

Denmark
Head coach: Jørgen Hvidemose

Nigeria
Head coach: Mabo Ismaila

North Korea
Head coach: Myong Dong-chan

United States
Head coach: Tony DiCicco

Group B

Brazil
Head coach: Wilsinho

Germany
Head coach: Tina Theune-Meyer

Italy
Head coach: Carlo Facchin

Mexico
Head coach: Leonardo Cuéllar

Group C

Canada
Head coach:  Neil Turnbull

Japan
Head coach: Satoshi Miyauchi

Norway
Head coach: Per-Mathias Høgmo

Russia
Head coach: Yuri Bystritsky

Group D

Australia
Head coach: Greg Brown

China PR
Head coach: Ma Yuanan

Ghana
Head coach: Emmanuel Kwasi Afranie

Sweden
Head coach: Marika Domanski-Lyfors

References
FIFA Women's World Cup 1999 - Teams
Ghana team
Sweden caps and goals

External links
 

Squads
FIFA Women's World Cup squads